K.C. Ramanna Hospital in Anantapur, Andhra Pradesh, India, is a multi-speciality hospital, providing services including Obstetrics, Gynaecology, Cardiology, Pediatrics and General Surgery. Along with pharmacy and laboratory services, There are four outpatient department blocks, OPD rooms general wards and special wards.

Hospitals in Andhra Pradesh
Anantapur, Andhra Pradesh
Year of establishment missing